Charles E. Cline (July 1858 – January 15, 1914) was an American politician in the state of Washington. He served in the Washington House of Representatives. From 1897 to 1899, he was the Speaker of that body.

References

Members of the Washington House of Representatives
1858 births
1914 deaths
19th-century American politicians